Artyom Denisovich Sokol (born 11 June 1997) is a Russian football player who plays for FC Arsenal Tula.

Club career
He made his debut in the Russian Football National League for FC Spartak-2 Moscow on 12 March 2017 in a game against FC Yenisey Krasnoyarsk.

On 11 February 2019, he joined Norwegian club Tromsø on loan until 10 July 2019. On 14 June 2019, his loan was extended until the end of 2019.

He made his debut in the Russian Premier League for FC Arsenal Tula on 11 July 2020 in a game against FC Tambov, replacing Vladislav Panteleyev in added time.

Career statistics

References

External links
 
 
 Profile by Russian Football National League
 

1997 births
Footballers from Moscow
Living people
Russian footballers
Russia youth international footballers
Association football defenders
FC Spartak-2 Moscow players
FC Arsenal Tula players
Tromsø IL players
Russian Premier League players
Russian First League players
Russian Second League players
Eliteserien players
Russian expatriate footballers
Expatriate footballers in Norway
Russian expatriate sportspeople in Norway